Colden Common Football Club is a football club based in Otterbourne, near Winchester, Hampshire, England. The club is affiliated to the Hampshire Football Association. The club is an FA Charter Standard club.

History
The club was founded in 1898 and re-formed in 1956, supported by the Banford family. Their Sunday league team, started in 1973, won numerous trophies before moving into Saturday football, and by the 1986–87 season had progressed to Hampshire League Division One. In 1992, they won the Hampshire League championship, a feat repeated in 1996, and won the Southampton Senior Cup in 1994. When the Hampshire League was reorganised in 1999, the club was placed in the Premier Division, at what was then level 9 of the English football league system, but was administratively relegated two years later because the ground failed to meet Premier Division standards.

In 2004, they won the "double" of the Division One title, thus earning promotion to the Wessex League, and Hampshire Intermediate Cup. Unable to apply for admission to Wessex League Division Two because of the requirement for floodlights, Colden Common were placed in Division Three, and went on to win the division title. Having finished their programme, it was still possible for Hayling United to overtake them by winning their last four games with a 19-goal swing, but they were unable to do so. In 2007, they withdrew from the Wessex League, because their inability to develop their home ground made it impossible for them to progress up the leagues, and joined the Hampshire Premier League. They won their second consecutive Hampshire Premier League title in 2010.

Ground

Colden Common play their home games at Oakwood Park Recreational Ground, Oakwood Avenue  Otterbourne  SO21 2ED.

Notable former players
England international Steve Guppy played for Colden Common at the beginning of his career, before joining Wycombe Wanderers.

Honours

League honours
Wessex League Division Three
 Winners (1): 2003–04
Hampshire Premier League
Winners (2): 2008–09, 2009–10
Hampshire League
Winners (2): 1991–92, 1995–96
Hampshire League Division One
 Winners (1): 2004–05

Cup honours
Southampton Senior Cup
 Winners (1): 1993–94
Andover Senior Cup
 Winners (1): 2002–03
Hampshire Intermediate Cup Final
 Winners (1): 2012–13
Hampshire Premier League Cup
 Winners (1): 2012–13

References

External links
 Club Website

Football clubs in Hampshire
Association football clubs established in 1898
1898 establishments in England
Sport in Winchester
Football clubs in England
Hampshire League
Wessex Football League
Hampshire Premier League